Iota Centauri, Latinized from ι Centauri, is a star in the southern constellation of Centaurus. Iota Centauri has an apparent visual magnitude of +2.73, making it easily visible to the naked eye.

The spectrum of ι Centauri matches a stellar classification of A2 V. It is an A-type main sequence star that is generating energy by the nuclear fusion of hydrogen in its core region. This energy is being radiated from the outer envelope of the star at an effective temperature of 8,600 K, giving the star a white hue. It has about 2.5 times the Sun's mass and is roughly 350 million years old. The abundance of elements other than hydrogen and helium, what astronomers term the metallicity, is only 35% of the abundance in the Sun.

This star has an excess emission of infrared indicating it is surrounded by a circumstellar disk of dust, known as a debris disk. The disk is located within an orbital radius of six Astronomical Units from the star. The dust is unusually luminous for a star this age, suggesting that some process may have recently increased the amount of debris, such as collisions between planetesimals. Alternatively, the planetesimals in this system may have unusual physical properties. As of 2011, a search for planets in this system has thus far been unsuccessful.

Iota Centauri appears to belong to the stellar kinematic group known as IC 2391. This is a group of around 16 co-moving stars that most likely originated in the same molecular cloud at least 45 million years ago.

References

A-type main-sequence stars
Centaurus (constellation)
Centauri, Iota
Durchmusterung objects
Gliese and GJ objects
115892
65109
5028